Zacharry "Zak" Michael Cummings (born August 2, 1984) is an American mixed martial artist, who currently competes in the Middleweight division of the Ultimate Fighting Championship. A professional competitor since 2007, he has also formerly competed for Strikeforce, MFC, Titan FC, and Bellator.

Background
Born in Irving, Texas, Cummings moved to Springfield, Missouri, at the age of three. After beginning wrestling in the sixth grade, he attended Glendale High School where he competed in wrestling, as well as football, baseball, and basketball. A state qualifier, he later attended Meramec Community College where he was a two-time NJCAA national qualifier his freshman and sophomore seasons. Due to an injury, Cummings transferred to Missouri State University to finish his degree, majoring in exercise and movement science. It was around this time that he began to training in mixed martial arts, and was 6–0 as an amateur before turning professional.

Mixed martial arts career

Early career
Cummings made his professional MMA debut in November 2007. He was undefeated for the first year and a half of his career, going 10–0 during that time period with a majority of his wins by TKO or submission.

This impressive streak earned him a shot in Strikeforce. He faced Tim Kennedy in the main event of Strikeforce Challengers 3, but lost via submission in the second round.

Post-Strikeforce, Cummings fought for various independent organizations and had one appearance for Bellator Fighting Championships. He added five more wins and two losses to his record during this time.

The Ultimate Fighter
In January 2013, it was revealed that Cummings was a cast member of The Ultimate Fighter: Team Jones vs. Team Sonnen. He won his preliminary bout over Nik Fekete quickly by TKO with the first punch he threw. Cummings was selected by Sonnen as his third pick (fifth overall).

Cummings faced Dylan Andrews in the elimination round. He lost via majority decision.

Ultimate Fighting Championship
Cummings made his debut against Ben Alloway on August 28, 2013, at UFC Fight Night: Condit vs. Kampmann 2. He won the fight via submission in the first round. The win also earned him his first Submission of the Night bonus award.

Cummings was expected to face Sérgio Moraes on November 30, 2013, at The Ultimate Fighter 18 Finale. However, Cummings and Moraes had to pull out of the event due to injury and were replaced by Sean Spencer and Drew Dober respectively.

Cummings was expected to face promotional newcomer Alberto Mina on March 1, 2014, at The Ultimate Fighter China Finale. However, at the weigh-ins for the event, Cummings came in eight pounds over the welterweight limit. On the advice of his coaches, Mina would not agree to compete at a catch weight, so the bout was scratched from the event.

Cummings faced Yan Cabral on May 10, 2014, at UFC Fight Night 40. He won the fight via unanimous decision.

Cummings was briefly linked to a bout with Kenny Robertson on July 16, 2014, at UFC Fight Night 45. However, Cummings was pulled from that fight in favor of a matchup with Gunnar Nelson on July 19, 2014 at UFC Fight Night 46 after his opponent Ryan LaFlare was removed from the card. He lost the fight via rear-naked choke.

Cummings was expected to face Antônio Braga Neto on July 25, 2015, at UFC on Fox 16. However, Braga Neto pulled out of the fight in early July and was replaced by promotional newcomer Dominique Steele. Cummings won the fight by TKO in the first round.

Cummings faced Nicolas Dalby on April 10, 2016, at UFC Fight Night 86, filling in for Bartosz Fabiński. He won the fight via unanimous decision.

Cummings next faced Santiago Ponzinibbio on August 6, 2016, at UFC Fight Night 92. He lost the fight via unanimous decision.

Cummings faced Alexander Yakovlev at UFC Fight Night 99 on November 19, 2016. He won the bout by submission in the second round.

Cummings faced Nathan Coy on April 15, 2017, at UFC on Fox 24. He won the fight via technical submission due to a guillotine choke in the first round.

Cummings was scheduled to face Thiago Alves on January 14, 2018, at UFC Fight Night: Stephens vs. Choi. On January 13, 2018, it was announced that Cummings injured his skull after a bathroom slip and the bout against Alves was cancelled as no replacement would be sought.

Cummings faced Michel Prazeres on May 19, 2018, at UFC Fight Night 129. He lost the back-and-forth fight via split decision.

Cummings faced Trevor Smith on December 15, 2018, at UFC on Fox 31. He won the fight by unanimous decision.

Cummings faced Trevin Giles on May 18, 2019, at UFC Fight Night 152. He won the fight via a guillotine choke submission in the third round.

Cummings faced Omari Akhmedov on September 7, 2019, at UFC 242. He lost the fight by unanimous decision.

Cummings was scheduled to face Andrew Sanchez on April 25, 2020. However, on April 9, Dana White, the president of UFC announced that this event was postponed to a future date

Cummings faced Alessio Di Chirico on August 29, 2020, at UFC Fight Night 175. He won the fight by unanimous decision.

Cummings was scheduled to face Sam Alvey on April 10, 2021, at UFC on ABC 2. However on March 11, Cummings withdrew from the bout for undisclosed reasons and was replaced by Julian Marquez.

It was later revealed that Cummings had suffered a serious back injury in camp for his last bout, resulting in him needing back surgery for herniated disc.

Cummings is scheduled to face Ed Herman on April 15, 2023, at UFC on ESPN 44.

Personal life
Cummings is the co-owner of Glory Fitness in Kansas City, where he also serves as a head coach.

Cummings has a daughter, Kyleigh (born 2017).

Championships and accomplishments
Ultimate Fighting Championship
Submission of the Night (One time) vs. Ben Alloway 
Midwest Cage Championships
MCC Middleweight Championship (One time)

Mixed martial arts record

|-
|Win
|align=center|24–7
|Alessio Di Chirico
|Decision (unanimous)
|UFC Fight Night: Smith vs. Rakić
|
|align=center|3
|align=center|5:00
|Las Vegas, Nevada, United States
|
|-
|Loss
|align=center|23–7
|Omari Akhmedov
|Decision (unanimous)
|UFC 242 
|
|align=center|3
|align=center|5:00
|Abu Dhabi, United Arab Emirates
|
|-
|Win
|align=center|23–6
|Trevin Giles 
|Submission (guillotine choke)
|UFC Fight Night: dos Anjos vs. Lee 
|
|align=center|3
|align=center|4:01
|Rochester, New York, United States
|
|-
|Win
|align=center|22–6
|Trevor Smith
|Decision (unanimous)
|UFC on Fox: Lee vs. Iaquinta 2
|
|align=center|3
|align=center|5:00
|Milwaukee, Wisconsin, United States
|
|- 
|Loss
|align=center|21–6
|Michel Prazeres
|Decision (split)
|UFC Fight Night: Maia vs. Usman
|
|align=center|3
|align=center|5:00
|Santiago, Chile
|
|-
|Win
|align=center|21–5
|Nathan Coy
|Technical Submission (guillotine choke)
|UFC on Fox: Johnson vs. Reis
|
|align=center|1
|align=center|4:21
|Kansas City, Missouri, United States
|
|-
|Win
|align=center|20–5
|Alexander Yakovlev
|Submission (straight armbar)
|UFC Fight Night: Mousasi vs. Hall 2
|
|align=center|2
|align=center|4:02
|Belfast, Northern Ireland
|
|-
|Loss
|align=center|19–5
|Santiago Ponzinibbio 
|Decision (unanimous)
|UFC Fight Night: Rodríguez vs. Caceres 
|
|align=center|3
|align=center|5:00
|Salt Lake City, Utah, United States
|
|-
|Win
|align=center|19–4
|Nicolas Dalby
|Decision (unanimous)
|UFC Fight Night: Rothwell vs. dos Santos
|
|align=center|3
|align=center|5:00
|Zagreb, Croatia
|
|-
| Win
| align=center| 18–4
| Dominique Steele
| TKO (punches)
| UFC on Fox: Dillashaw vs. Barão 2
| 
| align=center|1
| align=center|0:43
| Chicago, Illinois, United States
|
|-
| Loss
| align=center| 17–4
| Gunnar Nelson
| Submission (rear-naked choke)
| UFC Fight Night: McGregor vs. Brandao
| 
| align=center| 2
| align=center| 4:48
| Dublin, Ireland
| 
|-
| Win
| align=center| 17–3
| Yan Cabral
| Decision (unanimous)
| UFC Fight Night: Brown vs. Silva
| 
| align=center| 3
| align=center| 5:00
| Cincinnati, Ohio, United States
| 
|-
| Win
| align=center| 16–3
| Ben Alloway
| Submission (D'Arce choke)
| UFC Fight Night: Condit vs. Kampmann 2
| 
| align=center| 1
| align=center| 4:19
| Indianapolis, Indiana, United States
| 
|-
| Win
| align=center| 15–3
| Brandon Newsome
| Submission (guillotine choke)
| Slay Marketing: Fight Night Returns
|  
| align=center| 1
| align=center| 2:38
| Springfield, Missouri, United States
| 
|-
| Win
| align=center| 14–3
| Lamont Stafford
| Submission (rear-naked choke)
| Slay Marketing
|  
| align=center| 1
| align=center| 1:46
| Springfield, Missouri, United States
| 
|-
| Loss
| align=center| 13–3
| Ryan Jimmo 
| Decision (unanimous) 
| MFC 29: Conquer
|  
| align=center| 5
| align=center| 5:00
| Windsor, Ontario, Canada
| 
|-
| Win
| align=center| 13–2
| Jonathan Smith 
| TKO (punches) 
| SMMA: The Proving Ground 
|  
| align=center| 1
| align=center| 0:50
| Springfield, Missouri, United States
| 
|-
| Win
| align=center| 12–2
| Dennis Reed 
| Submission (armbar) 
| XCF 13: Cummings vs. Reed 
|  
| align=center| 1
| align=center| 0:58
| Springfield, Missouri, United States
| 
|-
| Win
| align=center| 11–2
| Rudy Bears
| Submission (D'Arce choke) 
| Bellator 26
|  
| align=center| 1
| align=center| 1:27
| Kansas City, Missouri, United States
| 
|-
| Loss
| align=center| 10–2
| Elvis Mutapčić
| Decision (unanimous) 
| Midwest Cage Championships 27 
|  
| align=center| 5
| align=center| 5:00
| Des Moines, Iowa, United States
| 
|-
| Loss
| align=center| 10–1
| Tim Kennedy 
| Submission (north-south choke) 
| Strikeforce Challengers: Kennedy vs. Cummings 
|  
| align=center| 2
| align=center| 2:43
| Tulsa, Oklahoma, United States
| 
|-
| Win
| align=center| 10–0
| Dominic Brown 
| TKO (punches) 
| FM: Productions 
| 
| align=center| 1
| align=center| 2:19
| Springfield, Missouri, United States
| 
|-
| Win
| align=center| 9–0
| Terry Martin
| Decision (split) 
| XCF: Rumble in Racetown 1 
|  
| align=center| 3
| align=center| 5:00
| Daytona Beach, Florida, United States
| 
|-
| Win
| align=center| 8–0
| Cole Jennet 
| Submission (neck crank) 
| MCC 17: Thanksgiving Throwdown 
|  
| align=center| 1
| align=center| 2:11
| West Des Moines, Iowa, United States
| 
|-
| Win
| align=center| 7–0
| Leo Pla 
| TKO (punches) 
| FM: Productions 
|  
| align=center| 2
| align=center| 3:48
| Springfield, Missouri, United States
| 
|-
| Win
| align=center| 6–0
| Danny Anderson 
| Decision (unanimous) 
| MCC 15: Lights Out! 
|  
| align=center| 3
| align=center| 5:00
| Des Moines, Iowa, United States
| 
|-
| Win
| align=center| 5–0
| Jason Broom 
| TKO (punches) 
| ISCF: Brawl at the Hall 
|  
| align=center| 2
| align=center| 2:21
| Joplin, Missouri, United States
| 
|-
| Win
| align=center| 4–0
| Victor Moreno 
| Submission (americana) 
| MCC 13: Contenders 
|  
| align=center| 2
| align=center| 2:19
| Urbandale, Iowa, United States
| 
|-
| Win
| align=center| 3–0
| James Bunch 
| Submission (choke) 
| FM: Productions 
|  
| align=center| 2
| align=center| 1:34
| Rolla, Missouri, United States
| 
|-
| Win
| align=center| 2–0
| Rudy Bears 
| Submission (choke) 
| FM: Productions 
|  
| align=center| 3
| align=center| 2:08
| Rolla, Missouri, United States
| 
|-
| Win
| align=center| 1–0
| Ron Jackson 
| Decision (unanimous) 
| Titan FC 10
|  
| align=center| 3
| align=center| N/A 
| Kansas City, Kansas, United States
|

Mixed martial arts exhibition record

| Loss
| align=center| 1–1
| Dylan Andrews
| Decision (majority)
| The Ultimate Fighter: Team Jones vs. Team Sonnen
|  (airdate)
| align=center| 2
| align=center| 5:00
| Las Vegas, Nevada, United States
| 
|-
| Win
| align=center| 1–0
| Nik Fekete
| KO (punches)
| The Ultimate Fighter: Team Jones vs. Team Sonnen
|  (airdate)
| align=center| 1
| align=center| N/A
| Las Vegas, Nevada, United States
|

See also
 List of current UFC fighters
 List of male mixed martial artists

References

External links
 
 

1984 births
Living people
People from Irving, Texas
American male mixed martial artists
Mixed martial artists from Texas
Welterweight mixed martial artists
Mixed martial artists utilizing wrestling
Mixed martial artists utilizing Brazilian jiu-jitsu
Missouri State University alumni
Ultimate Fighting Championship male fighters
People awarded a black belt in Brazilian jiu-jitsu
American practitioners of Brazilian jiu-jitsu
American male sport wrestlers